The World Electric Vehicle Association (WEVA) is an organization that promotes electric vehicles.

Member associations 

It is composed of :
 The Electric Drive Transportation Association (EDTA)
 The Electric Vehicle Association of Asia Pacific (EVAAP)
 The European Association for Battery, Hybrid and Fuel Cell Electric Vehicles (AVERE)

EDTA 
The Electric Drive Transportation Association (EDTA) is the American branch, based in Washington, D.C.

Founded in 1989, the EDTA is a US industry association dedicated to the promotion of electric drive EDTA supports the sustainable commercialization of all electric drive transportation technologies by providing in-depth information, education, industry networking, public policy advocacy and international conferences and exhibitions.

EVAAP 
Electric Vehicle Association of Asia Pacific (EVAAP) is an international organization which promotes the use of electric vehicles in the Asia and the Pacific.

AVERE 
The European Association for Battery, Hybrid and Fuel Cell Electric Vehicles (AVERE) was founded in 1978 and is based in Brussels. It is a European network of users, NGO's, associations, interest groups, etc. Its main objective is promoting the use of battery, hybrid and fuel cell electric vehicles (individually and in fleets) for priority uses in order to achieve a greener mobility for cities and countries.

Structure
AVERE is a federated and decentralized structure with 17 National Associations, 2 European networks (CITELEC and Eurelectric) as well as direct members. In total, there are over 1000 direct and indirect members.

Activities
The main activities are related to dissemination, networking, monitoring, participation in European and multilateral projects, lobbying, research and development. In public policy advocacy AVERE presents the concerns of electric drive industry and R&D bodies to the European Commission which plays the key role in helping the development of clean vehicles.

As a part of WEVA, AVERE organizes Electric Vehicle Symposiums (EVS). It also collaborates in regional events in different countries and in many specialized conferences and workshops.

World Electric Vehicle Journal (WEVJ) 
WEVA publishes an international scientific journal called the World Electric Vehicle Journal. The World Electric Vehicle Journal is a peer-reviewed international scientific journal that covers all studies related to battery, hybrid and fuel cell electric vehicles comprehensively. It publishes selected contributions from the EVS Symposia after an additional review process.

See also 
 CalCars
 Electric vehicle
 Japan Automobile Research Institute (JARI)
 Repower America

References

External links 
 WEVA official site

International climate change organizations
Non-profit organizations based in California
Palo Alto, California
Plug-in hybrid vehicles
Environmental organizations based in California
Electric vehicle organizations
Organizations established in 1990